I due colonnelli (internationally released as The Two Colonels) is a 1963 Italian comedy film directed by Steno. The character of Totò took inspiration from a similar character he played in Totò Diabolicus.

Plot 
The story is of Italian and British troops facing off on the Greek-Albanian border in 1943.  Both sides take, lose, and retake a border village countless times during the entire movie.  The village is taken and retaken by both sides so many times that the locals don't even pay attention to the battles any more and openly collaborate with whichever side is occupying the village at that time.  Both sides use the same hotel as their HQ and a friendship and mutual respect even develops between the two opposing commanding officers.  This goes on until the Germans arrive and order the Italian commander to destroy the village killing its inhabitants, an order the Italian commander refuses to carry out bringing on a death sentence.  His men refuse the German officer's order to fire and are also condemned to death.  The British recapture the village just in time to save the Italians, all rejoice at the news that Italy has just asked for an armistice.

Cast 
Totò: Colonel Antonio Di Maggio Regio Esercito
Walter Pidgeon: Colonel Timothy Henderson Royal Fusiliers
Nino Taranto: Sgt. Quaglia
Giorgio Bixio: Soldier Giobatta Parodi
Toni Ucci: Mazzetta 
Nino Terzo: Soldier La Padula 
Scilla Gabel: Iride
 Gérard Herter: German General von Tirpitz
Roland Bartrop (as Roland von Bartrop): Major Kruger
Andrea Scotti : Iride's husband

References

External links
 

1963 films
Films directed by Stefano Vanzina
Italian comedy films
Italian World War II films
Films set in Axis-occupied Greece
Films set in Albania
Films shot in Lazio
1963 comedy films
Films with screenplays by Giovanni Grimaldi
Films scored by Gianni Ferrio
1960s English-language films
English-language Italian films
1960s Italian-language films
1960s multilingual films
Italian multilingual films
Macaroni Combat films
1960s Italian films